Petronell-Carnuntum is a community of Bruck an der Leitha in Austria. It is known for its annual  World Theatre Festival.

History
The village derives the second half of its name, Carnuntum, from the ancient Roman legionary fortress and headquarters of the Pannonian fleet from 50 AD, and later a large city of 50,000 inhabitants.

There is a 2000-year-old amphitheatre, which was built outside the city walls around the end of the 2nd century AD. The arena was originally surrounded by stadium seating for 13,000 spectators. There was an hexagonal basin speculated to be a baptismal font built in the 4th century AD, by which time the amphitheatre's usage had changed.

Geography
Petronell-Carnuntum lies in the Industrieviertel area of Lower Austria. About 26 percent of the municipality is forested. It lies on the southern bank of the Danube, southwest of Hainburg an der Donau.

Culture
The World Theatre Festival Carnumtum is held each year in the ancient amphitheatre. It is organised by Art Carnuntum, a cultural organisation that aims support the cultural and philosophical heritage of Europe and promotes classical drama in both traditional and contemporary styles. The festival was founded around 1988 by Piero Bordin, who died suddenly in March 2021. His daughter Constantin Bordin is artistic director. Collaborators from Greece include Irini Pappas, Michalis Kakogianis, and Theodoros Terzopoulus, and the popular festival has become known as an international centre for ancient drama as well as European classical and modern music.

The festival was held in August in 2021.

See also 
 Carnuntum
 Heidentor
 Amber Road

References

External links 
 

Cities and towns in Bruck an der Leitha District
Populated places on the Danube